Francis Andrews (1718 – 18 June 1774) was an Irish politician.

Andrews was born in Derry and educated at Trinity College Dublin. and became a Fellow in 1740.

In 1758 he was appointed Provost of Trinity College Dublin, and in 1759 was elected to the Irish House of Commons for Midleton. From 1761 until his death he sat for the City of Londonderry. He was appointed to the Irish Privy Council on 6 April 1761.

On his death in 1774 he left £3,000 to found the Andrews chair of astronomy at Trinity and the Dunsink Observatory.

References

 https://web.archive.org/web/20090817100611/http://www.tcd.ie/provost/former/f_andrews.php
 https://web.archive.org/web/20090601105535/http://www.leighrayment.com/commons/irelandcommons.htm
 

1718 births
1774 deaths
Irish MPs 1727–1760
Irish MPs 1761–1768
Irish MPs 1769–1776
Members of the Parliament of Ireland (pre-1801) for County Cork constituencies
Members of the Parliament of Ireland (pre-1801) for County Londonderry constituencies
Members of the Privy Council of Ireland
Alumni of Trinity College Dublin
Fellows of Trinity College Dublin
Provosts of Trinity College Dublin
Place of birth missing